Enrique "Kike" López Delgado (born 12 January 1988) is a Spanish professional footballer who plays as a right winger or a right-back for UE Cornellà.

Club career
A product of Real Valladolid's youth system, López was born in Salamanca, Castile and León, and appeared in three first-team games in 2007–08 all as a late substitute. He would finish the season loaned to Segunda División side Polideportivo Ejido and, after not being able to help prevent relegation, scoring in the last minute of a 1–1 home draw against Gimnàstic de Tarragona, he returned to Valladolid in July.

Still in La Liga, López again appeared rarely for Valladolid in the 2008–09 campaign. Subsequently, he was sold to UD Salamanca in late July 2009, for three years, with the former club having an option to rebuy in the first two.

In the following seasons, safe for the first half of 2011–12 with Villarreal CF B and the full 2012–13 with AD Alcorcón in the second tier, López competed exclusively in the Segunda División B.

References

External links

1988 births
Living people
Sportspeople from Salamanca
Spanish footballers
Footballers from Castile and León
Association football defenders
Association football wingers
La Liga players
Segunda División players
Segunda División B players
Primera Federación players
Segunda Federación players
Real Valladolid Promesas players
Real Valladolid players
Polideportivo Ejido footballers
UD Salamanca players
Villarreal CF B players
CD Tenerife players
AD Alcorcón footballers
Cádiz CF players
CD Alcoyano footballers
CD Atlético Baleares footballers
UD Ibiza players
UD Melilla footballers
UE Cornellà players